The toothy splayfoot salamander (Chiropterotriton multidentatus), also known as the toothy salamander, is a species of salamander in the family Plethodontidae. It is endemic to Mexico and known from the Sierra Madre Oriental of southeastern Hidalgo, Tlaxcala, and south-central San Luis Potosí, at elevations of  asl.

Its natural habitats are pine and pine-oak forests. It is an arboreal species living in bromeliads, and also in crevices. The species is declining, and can no longer be found at its type locality in San Luis Potosí. Reasons for the decline are unknown, but habitat loss is likely involved.

References

Chiropterotriton
Endemic amphibians of Mexico
Fauna of the Sierra Madre Oriental
Taxonomy articles created by Polbot
Amphibians described in 1939